Roskilde Gymnasium is a gymnasium (upper secondary school) in central Roskilde, Denmark. It is based in the historical premises of Roskilde Cathedral School, facing the square in front of Roskilde Cathedral. The school has 1030 students and 90 teachers and a wide variety of study programs.

History
Roskilde Cathedral School was established in the grounds outside Roskilde Cathedral as far back as 1020. in the 1960s it had outgrown its campus which could not be expanded due to the historical surroundings and it therefore moved to a new site on Holbækvej in Hyrdehøj in 1969. Roskilde Municipality established a temporary school in the old buildings and in 1979 it was taken over by Copenhagen County under the name Roskilde Amtsgymnasium. The school was taken over in 2007 when the Danish counties were abolished in the 2007 Danish Municipal Reform and changed its name to Roskilde Gymnasium.

Campus
The main building facing the cathedral square is from 1842 and was designed by Jørgen Hansen Koch  (1787–1860) in the Neoclassical style but integrates medieval parts. It has later been expanded several times. Most recently, a new Science Centre has been built in the so-called Latin Garden in 2012.

Notable alumni
  Claus Larsen-Jensen, politician
 Mette Gjerskov, politician
 Zenia Stampe, politician

References

External links
 Official website

Gymnasiums in Denmark
Education in Roskilde
Jørgen Hansen Koch buildings
Listed buildings and structures in Roskilde Municipality
Listed educational buildings in Denmark
School buildings completed in 1842